Commercial Township is a township in Cumberland County, in the U.S. state of New Jersey. It is part of the Vineland-Bridgeton metropolitan statistical area. As of the 2020 United States census, the township's population was 4,669, a decrease of 509 (−9.8%) from the 2010 census count of 5,178, which in turn reflected a decline of 81 (−1.5%) from the 5,259 counted in the 2000 census.

Commercial Township was incorporated as a township by an act of the New Jersey Legislature on February 27, 1874, from portions of Downe Township. The township was named for its shellfish industry.

Geography
According to the U.S. Census Bureau, the township had a total area of 34.41 square miles (89.13 km2), including 31.91 square miles (82.66 km2) of land and 2.50 square miles (6.47 km2) of water (7.26%).

Laurel Lake (2010 Census population of 2,989), Port Norris (population of 1,377 as of 2010), and Mauricetown are unincorporated communities and census-designated places (CDPs) located within Commercial Township.

Other unincorporated communities, localities and place names located partially or completely within the township include Baileytown, Bivalve, Buckshutem, Haleyville, Lores Mill, North Port Norris and Shell Pile.

The township borders Downe Township, Maurice River Township, Millville and the Delaware Bay.

Demographics

2010 census

The Census Bureau's 2006–2010 American Community Survey showed that (in 2010 inflation-adjusted dollars) median household income was $45,323 (with a margin of error of +/− $7,873) and the median family income was $46,790 (+/− $10,373). Males had a median income of $42,297 (+/− $6,069) versus $31,391 (+/− $5,851) for females. The per capita income for the borough was $19,242 (+/− $2,315). About 18.0% of families and 18.8% of the population were below the poverty line, including 20.9% of those under age 18 and 21.2% of those age 65 or over.

2000 census
As of the 2000 United States census there were 5,259 people, 1,873 households, and 1,367 families residing in the township. The racial makeup of the township was 82.98% White, 13.42% African American, 0.42% Native American, 0.23% Asian, 0.02% Pacific Islander, 1.01% from other races, and 1.92% from two or more races. Hispanic or Latino of any race were 3.86% of the population.

There were 1,873 households, out of which 35.3% had children under the age of 18 living with them, 49.1% were married couples living together, 16.0% had a female householder with no husband present, and 21.0% were non-families. 21.4% of all households were made up of individuals, and 9.1% had someone living alone who was 65 years of age or older.  The average household size was 2.80 and the average family size was 3.22.

In the township the population was spread out, with 28.3% under the age of 18, 9.3% from 18 to 24, 29.3% from 25 to 44, 20.8% from 45 to 64, and 12.3% who were 65 years of age or older.  The median age was 34 years. For every 100 females, there were 97.0 males.  For every 100 females age 18 and over, there were 95.0 males.

The median income for a household in the township was $34,960, and the median income for a family was $37,500. Males had a median income of $35,030 versus $21,610 for females. The per capita income for the township was $14,663.  About 13.0% of families and 15.8% of the population were below the poverty line, including 21.3% of those under age 18 and 11.9% of those age 65 or over.

Government

Local government
Commercial Township is governed under the Township form of New Jersey municipal government, one of 141 municipalities (of the 564) statewide that use this form, the second-most commonly used form of government in the state. The governing body is comprised of a three-member Township Committee, whose members are elected directly by the voters at-large in partisan elections to serve three-year terms of office on a staggered basis, with one seat coming up for election each year as part of the November general election in a three-year cycle. At an annual reorganization meeting, the Township Committee selects one of its members to serve as Mayor and another as Deputy Mayor, each serving a one-year term.

, members of the Commercial Township Committee are Mayor Warren "Mike" Vizzard (D, term on committee and as mayor ends December 31, 2022), Deputy Mayor Fletcher Jamison (D, term on committee and as deputy mayor ends 2023) and Joseph E. Klaudi (R, 2024).

After Mayor Judson Moore resigned from office in March 2016, Ronald Sutton was named as mayor to replace Moore and Fletcher Jamison shifted to deputy mayor.

In the November 2013 general election, Moore became the first candidate to win election running as an independent, while Ronald Sutton was elected to fill the vacant seat of Bill Riggin, who had resigned from office.

Federal, state and county representation 
Commercial Township is located in the 2nd Congressional District and is part of New Jersey's 1st state legislative district. Prior to the 2011 reapportionment following the 2010 Census, Commercial Township had been in the 3rd state legislative district.

Politics
As of March 2011, there were a total of 3,183 registered voters in Commercial Township, of which 1,004 (31.5%) were registered as Democrats, 568 (17.8%) were registered as Republicans and 1,608 (50.5%) were registered as Unaffiliated. There were 3 voters registered as Libertarians or Greens.

In the 2012 presidential election, Democrat Barack Obama received 57.6% of the vote (983 cast), ahead of Republican Mitt Romney with 41.1% (701 votes), and other candidates with 1.3% (23 votes), among the 1,726 ballots cast by the township's 3,270 registered voters (19 ballots were spoiled), for a turnout of 52.8%. In the 2008 presidential election, Democrat Barack Obama received 55.0% of the vote (1,032 cast), ahead of Republican John McCain, who received 41.7% (781 votes), with 1,875 ballots cast among the township's 3,151 registered voters, for a turnout of 59.5%. In the 2004 presidential election, Republican George W. Bush received 50.2% of the vote (849 ballots cast), outpolling Democrat John Kerry, who received 49.2% (832 votes), with 1,690 ballots cast among the township's 2,931 registered voters, for a turnout percentage of 57.7.

In the 2013 gubernatorial election, Republican Chris Christie received 60.9% of the vote (691 cast), ahead of Democrat Barbara Buono with 36.4% (413 votes), and other candidates with 2.7% (31 votes), among the 1,191 ballots cast by the township's 3,031 registered voters (56 ballots were spoiled), for a turnout of 39.3%. In the 2009 gubernatorial election, Democrat Jon Corzine received 46.5% of the vote (475 ballots cast), ahead of both Republican Chris Christie with 43.6% (446 votes) and Independent Chris Daggett with 6.0% (61 votes), with 1,022 ballots cast among the township's 3,017 registered voters, yielding a 33.9% turnout.

Education
The Commercial Township School District serves public school students in pre-kindergarten through eighth grade. As of the 2018–19 school year, the district, comprised of two schools, had an enrollment of 529 students and 42.0 classroom teachers (on an FTE basis), for a student–teacher ratio of 12.6:1. Schools in the district (with 2018–19 enrollment data from the National Center for Education Statistics) are 
Haleyville-Mauricetown Elementary School with 368 students in grades Pre-K–5 and 
Port Norris Middle School with 166 students in grades 6–8.

Students in ninth through twelfth grades for public school attend high school in Millville together with students from Lawrence Township and Maurice River Township, as part of a sending/receiving relationship with the Millville Public Schools under which students attend Memorial High School for ninth grade and half of the tenth grade and Millville Senior High School for half of the tenth grade through the twelfth grade.

Students are also eligible to attend Cumberland County Technology Education Center in Vineland, serving students from the entire county in its full-time technical training programs, which are offered without charge to students who are county residents.

Transportation

County Route 553 is the most significant road serving Commercial Township.

Notable people

People who were born in, residents of, or otherwise closely associated with Commercial Township include:

 Helen Gandy (1897–1988), secretary to J. Edgar Hoover, Director of the Federal Bureau of Investigation, for 54 years
 Elden H. Johnson (1921–1944), United States Army soldier who was awarded the Medal of Honor for his actions in World War II
 Henry C. Loudenslager (1852–1911), represented New Jersey's 1st congressional district from 1893 to 1911
 Larry Milbourne (born 1951), second baseman who played for 11 seasons in Major League Baseball
 Dallas Lore Sharp (1870–1929), author and university professor

Points of interest
 Caesar Hoskins Log Cabin

References

External links

Official website

 
1874 establishments in New Jersey
Populated places established in 1874
Township form of New Jersey government
Townships in Cumberland County, New Jersey